Jack Ward Smith (November 16, 1913 – July 3, 2006), known as Smilin' Jack Smith, was an American crooner, radio host and actor.

Born in Seattle, Washington, United States, by 1933 Smith was in a singing trio, The Three Ambassadors. In 1939, he became a solo crooner with a voice described as a "strong baritone with a tenor lilt"; he was billed as "The Singer with a Smile in His Voice." He also sang with the Phil Harris Orchestra, recording "Here It is Only Monday".

Establishing a radio program, The Jack Smith Show, in 1945, he went on to host such guests as Dinah Shore, Margaret Whiting, John Serry Sr. and Ginny Simms. In a 1945 poll of radio critics by Motion Picture Daily, Smith was voted radio's "most promising star of tomorrow."

Following a guest appearance in the musical film Make Believe Ballroom (1949), Smith was offered the second lead in Warner Bros.' On Moonlight Bay (1951) opposite Doris Day.

With the television's arrival, radio saw a decline in audiences, and Smith lost his show in 1952. In 1953, Smith briefly hosted the NBC game show Place the Face, only to be replaced by Jack Bailey, who in turn was followed by Bill Cullen. Smith became the host of You Asked For It in 1958, staying with it in various roles until 1991. He also appeared as himself in the "Fearless Fonzarelli" episode of Happy Days, aired in 1975; in that episode, Smith hosted You Wanted To See It, a fictionalized version of his real show, bearing witness to Fonzie's feat of leaping 14 garbage cans on his motorcycle.

Jack Smith died in June 2006 in Westlake Village, California of leukemia, aged 92.

Filmography

References

External links

2 episodes of The Jack Smith Show from Old Time Radio Researchers Organization library
Article about Mr. and Mrs. Jack Smith from TV Radio Mirror
Another article about Mr. and Mrs. Jack Smith from Radio Mirror
"With a Smile in His Voice" article from Radio TV Mirror

1913 births
2006 deaths
Deaths from cancer in California
Deaths from leukemia
Musicians from Seattle
20th-century American musicians
People from Westlake Village, California
Singers from Washington (state)
American male film actors
Male actors from Washington (state)
20th-century American male actors
American game show hosts
20th-century American singers